Maiden Bradley Priory was a priory in Wiltshire, England. It was founded as a leper colony in 1164, and in 1189 was handed over to the Augustinian order. It was dissolved in 1536.

References

Monasteries in Wiltshire
Augustinian monasteries in England